Jiaokou may refer to:

Jiaokou County, in Shanxi, China
Jiaokou Station, in Guangzhou, Guangdong, China